Félix Fournier (3 May 1803 - 9 June 1877) was a dignitary of the Catholic Church and a French politician, and bishop of Nantes from 1870 to his death in 1877.

Biography
Félix Fournier was born on 3 May 1803 in Nantes and died on 9 June 1877 in Rome (Italy). Fournier was ordained in 1827. He was vicar and parish priest of the parish of Saint-Nicolas in Nantes from 1836 to 1870 before reaching the Bishopric.

Fournier was elected once, in 1848, as a deputy of Lower Loire and participated in the work of the Constituent Assembly where he sat on the right with the supporters of Bonapartism. Fournier played a decisive role in the completion work of the Cathedral of Nantes (inaugurated in 1891), trying to gain the government's interest and obtaining the necessary funding for completion. In 1837 he founded a local Society of Saint Vincent de Paul.

He died during a pilgrimage to Rome in 1877. His tomb was installed in 1883.

Tributes
The courtyard of Basilica of St. Nicolas was named Place Félix Fournier in his memory at the end of the nineteenth century.

See also
Catholic Church in France

References

1803 births
1877 deaths
Bishops of Nantes
19th-century French Roman Catholic bishops